Anton Alekseev may refer to:

 Anton Alekseyev (born 1984), Ukraine-born Russian football player
 Anton Alekseev (mathematician) (born 1967), Russian mathematician